Szewce may refer to the following places in Poland:
Szewce, Lower Silesian Voivodeship (south-west Poland)
Szewce, Kuyavian-Pomeranian Voivodeship (north-central Poland)
Szewce, Lublin Voivodeship (east Poland)
Szewce, Kielce County in Świętokrzyskie Voivodeship (south-central Poland)
Szewce, Sandomierz County in Świętokrzyskie Voivodeship (south-central Poland)
Szewce, Masovian Voivodeship (east-central Poland)
Szewce, Gmina Buk in Greater Poland Voivodeship (west-central Poland)
Szewce, Gmina Kleszczewo in Greater Poland Voivodeship (west-central Poland)